Illuminate... (The Hits and More) is the fourth studio album by English boy band 911. It is their first album release since The Greatest Hits and a Little Bit More in 2000, and their first album to be released digitally, without an accompanying CD release. Consisting of seven re-recorded hits and seven new tracks, it was released worldwide on 9 September 2013, the same day as its lead single "2 Hearts 1 Love". The album debuted at No. 162 on the UK Albums Chart.

Track listing

Charts

Release history

References

2013 albums
911 (English group) albums